Louis Hermann Pammel (1862–1931) was an American botanist, conservationist, and professor of botany.

Biography
Louis Hermann Pammel was the second of six children and the oldest son of his parents who were Prussian immigrants to Wisconsin. In 1885 he graduated with a bachelor's degree in agriculture from the University of Wisconsin-Madison, where William Trelease taught him in courses in ecology, cryptogamic botany, and botanical taxonomy. In July 1885 he became employed in a Chicago seed company. In October 1885 he became a medical student at Philadelphia's Hahnemann Medical College. However, he soon accepted an offer to work as an assistant to the botanist William G. Farlow at Harvard University and arrived in Cambridge, Massachusetts in early December 1885. In the spring of 1886 Pammel received a letter from William Trelease, his former botany professor at Wisconsin, who had moved in 1885 to Washington University in St. Louis. The letter offered Pammel an assistantship at the Shaw School of Botany with a salary of $50 per month for the eight months of the academic year. He accepted and began work there in the fall of 1886. He became a graduate student there and in 1887 married Augusta Marie Emmel. During the next decade, the couple had six children. In 1887 he had a summer job at the Texas Agricultural Experiment Station at College Station, Texas; he discovered that root rot of cotton plants was caused by a fungus, which Benjamin Duggar in 1916 named Phymatotricum omnivorum; it is now known as Phymatotrichopis omnivorum or Texas root rot. This discovery gained Pammel a national reputation and he later used this research for his master's degree at the University of Wisconsin. In February 1889 he became a professor of botany at the Iowa State Agricultural College (later renamed Iowa State University). In 1899 he received his PhD from Washington University in St. Louis. At Iowa State, Pammel became head of the department of botany in 1918 and retired as professor emeritus in 1929. He played an important role in securing land for Iowa's state parks.

He was president of the Iowa Academy of Science in 1892–1893 and again in 1923–1924.

Among Pammel's notable students are George Washington Carver and Ada Hayden.

Eponyms
 Melica subulata var. pammelii (Scribn.) C. L. Hitchc. (Pammel's oniongrass)
 Hordeum pammelii Scribn. & Ball (a grass)
 Senecio pammelii Greenman (a composite)

Selected publications
 
 
 
 with Julius Buel Weems, Carleton R. Ball, Frank Lamson-Scribner, and Harry Foster Bain:  (vol. 1, 1901; vol. 2, 1904)
 
 
  
 with collaboration from Charlotte M. King, John Nathan Martin, Jules Cool Cunningham, Ada Hayden, and Harriette Susan Kellogg:

References

External links

American botanists
1862 births
1931 deaths
Writers from La Crosse, Wisconsin
University of Wisconsin–Madison College of Agricultural and Life Sciences alumni
Washington University in St. Louis alumni
Iowa State University faculty